The Baroda women's cricket team is a women's cricket team that represents the Indian city of Vadodara. The team competes in the Women's Senior One Day Trophy and the Women's Senior T20 Trophy.

Current squad

Binaisha Surti
Palak Patel
Amrita Joseph
Pragya Rawat
Tarannum Pathan
Jenita Fernandes (wk)
Radha Yadav
Hrutvisha Patel
Jaya Mohite
Tanvir Shaikh
Kesha
Maurya Ridhi

See also
 Baroda cricket team

References

Cricket in Gujarat
Sport in Vadodara
Women's cricket teams in India